Lillington is a town in Harnett County, North Carolina, United States. Its population was 3,194 at the 2010 census, and was 4,735 in the 2020 census. It is the county seat of Harnett County. Lillington is a part of the Dunn micropolitan area, which is also a part of the greater Raleigh–Durham–Cary combined statistical area as defined by the United States Census Bureau.

Geography
Lillington is located near the geographic center of Harnett County. U.S. Route 401 (Main Street) passes through the center of town, leading north  to Raleigh, the state capital, and south  to Fayetteville. U.S. Route 421 follows US-401 along North Main Street through the town, but turns west out of town via West Front Street, leading  to Sanford. US-421 turns east from US-401 near the northern end of town and leads southeast  to Dunn.

The Cape Fear River crosses the northern part of the town.

Poorhouse Creek, a tributary to the Cape Fear River, begins on the southwestern end of Lillington.

History
A post office called Lillington has been in operation since 1874.  The town was originally called Harnett Court House. The town of Lillington is named for John Alexander Lillington (circa 1725–1786), aka Alexander John Lillington, who was a Patriot officer from North Carolina in the American Revolutionary War, notably fighting in the Battle of Moore's Creek Bridge in 1776 and serving as brigadier general in the state militia.

The Summer Villa and the McKay-Salmon House and Summerville Presbyterian Church and Cemetery are listed on the National Register of Historic Places.

Demographics

2020 census

As of the 2020 United States census, 4,735 people, 924 households, and 540 families resided in the town.

2000 census
As of the census of 2000,  2,915 people, 799 households, and 484 families resided in the town. The population density was 730.5 people per square mile (282.1/km). The 894 housing units averaged 224.0 per square mile (86.5/km). The racial makeup of the town was 54.75% White, 40.55% African American, 0.79% Native American, 0.45% Asian, and 2.26% from two or more races. Hispanics or Latinos of any race were 4.08% of the population.

Of the 799 households, 25.8% had children under 18 living with them, 39.5% were married couples living together, 18.0% had a female householder with no husband present, and 39.4% were not families. About 33.9% of all households were made up of individuals, and 17.6% had someone living alone who was 65 or older. The average household size was 2.26, and the average family size was 2.88.

In the town, the population was distributed as 15.2% under 18, 8.9% from 18 to 24, 40.4% from 25 to 44, 17.5% from 45 to 64, and 17.9% who were 65 or older. The median age was 37 years. For every 100 females, there were 141.9 males. For every 100 females age 18 and over, there were 154.1 males.

The median income for a household in the town was $30,670, and for a family was $42,366. Males had a median income of $30,305 versus $23,214 for females. The per capita income for the town was $13,664. About 12.4% of families and 20.3% of the population were below the poverty line, including 31.2% of those under age 18 and 20.4% of those age 65 or over.

Notable people 
 Daisy Hendley Gold (1893–1975, died in Lillington), author and journalist
 Link Neal (born 1978) and Rhett McLaughlin (born 1977), of entertainment duo Rhett & Link
 Paul Eliot Green (1894-1977) was a Pulitzer Prize winning playwright.

See also
 Lillington Township, Harnett County, North Carolina

References

External links
 Town of Lillington official website
 Lillington Area Chamber of Commerce
 The Daily Record

Towns in Harnett County, North Carolina
Towns in North Carolina
County seats in North Carolina